Le Manoir is the name of two communes in France:

 Le Manoir, Calvados
 Le Manoir, Eure

It is also a shortened name for a hotel/restaurant:
Le Manoir aux Quat' Saisons